Michael or Mike Barnard may refer to:

 Mike Barnard (sportsman, born 1933) (1933–2018), English cricketer and footballer
 Mike Barnard (cricketer, born 1990), English cricketer
 Michael Barnard (darts player) (born 1976), English darts player
 Michael Barnard (politician) (1942–1999), Australian politician